Star FM was an Australian radio network, consisting of Top 40/CHR formatted stations in New South Wales, Victoria and South Australia. The brand was created by NOVA Entertainment, then known as DMG Regional Radio, in 1999, with the network being sold to Southern Cross Austereo.

Programming
The network's stations are aimed at the under-35 section of the market, playing Top 40 and popular music. For most stations, the only local program heard on these stations is the breakfast programme, with Alo Baker's Workday networked from the Gold Coast Media Centre, and drive/nights programming coming from the Southern Cross Austereo's metropolitan stations Fox FM in Melbourne and 2Day FM in Sydney.

In 2007, Star FM changed its major positioning statement from "Todays Best Music" to "Your HIT Music Station". The positioning statement was changed again in June 2011 to "Your #1 HIT Music Station" and following the Southern Cross Media/Austereo merger and became "Fresh & First" in 2013 until recently it was changed again to "Hits & Old Skool"

On 15 December 2016, all stations that are a part of the Hit Network were rebranded as Hit, meaning that the Star FM and Hot FM brandings ceased to exist.

Stations

New South Wales
2AAY 104.9 MHz Albury
2CSF 105.5 MHz Coffs Harbour
2DBO 93.5 MHz Dubbo
2GZF 105.9 MHz Orange
2RGF 99.7 MHz Griffith
2ROX 105.1 MHz Kempsey/102.3 MHz Port Macquarie
2WZD 93.1 MHz Wagga Wagga

Victoria
3BDG 91.9 MHz Bendigo
3MDA 99.5 MHz Mildura
3SEA 94.3 MHz and 97.9 MHz Gippsland (formerly Sea FM)
3SUN 96.9 MHz Shepparton (formerly Sun FM)

South Australia
5SEF 96.1 MHz Mount Gambier

References

External links
Star FM
Wild Revolution

1999 establishments in Australia
Defunct Australian radio networks
Contemporary hit radio stations in Australia
Southern Cross Media Group